The men's hammer throw event at the 1952 Summer Olympics took place on 24 July at the Helsinki Olympic Stadium. There were 33 competitors from 18 nations. The maximum number of athletes per nation had been set at 3 since the 1930 Olympic Congress. The event was won by József Csermák of Hungary, the nation's second consecutive victory in the event. Imre Németh, who had won four years earlier, took bronze; he was the fourth man to win multiple medals in the event. Silver went to Karl Storch of Germany.

Background

This was the 11th appearance of the event, which has been held at every Summer Olympics except 1896. Six of the 13 finalists from the 1948 Games returned: gold medalist Imre Németh of Hungary, silver medalist Ivan Gubijan of Yugoslavia, fourth-place finisher Samuel Felton of the United States, fifth-place finisher Lauri Tamminen of Finland, seventh-place finisher Teseo Taddia of Italy, and eleventh-place finisher Duncan Clark of Great Britain. Németh was among the favorites to repeat; other contenders included 1950 European champion Sverre Strandli of Norway and Karl Storch of Germany.

Belgium, Pakistan, Puerto Rico, Romania, and the Soviet Union each made their debut in the event. The United States appeared for the 11th time, the only nation to have competed at each appearance of the event to that point.

Competition format

The competition used the two-round format introduced in 1936, with the qualifying round completely separate from the divided final. In qualifying, each athlete received three attempts; those recording a mark of at least 49.00 metres advanced to the final. If fewer than 12 athletes achieved that distance, the top 12 would advance. The results of the qualifying round were then ignored. Finalists received three throws each, with the top six competitors receiving an additional three attempts. The best distance among those six throws counted.

Records

Prior to the competition, the existing world and Olympic records were as follows.

József Csermák set a new Olympic record with a distance of 57.20 metres in the qualifying round. In the final, five men beat the old Olympic record and a sixth man tied it; the three medalists all bettered Csermák's qualifying round mark. Csermák's first throw in the final went 58.45 metres; his third went 60.34 metres for a new world record.

Schedule

All times are Eastern European Summer Time (UTC+3)

Results

Qualifying round

Qualification: All throwers reaching 49 metres advanced to the final, with a minimum of 12 advancing.

Final

References

External links
Official Olympic Report, la84.org.

Athletics at the 1952 Summer Olympics
Hammer throw at the Olympics
Men's events at the 1952 Summer Olympics